Mecklenburg-Güstrow was a state of the Holy Roman Empire in Northern Germany, that existed on three occasions ruled by the House of Mecklenburg at Güstrow.

History

A first short-lived predecessor existed after the death of Henry IV, Duke of Mecklenburg in 1477 and the subsequent partition of his lands among his sons in 1480. Albert VI received the estates of the former Lordship of Werle around Güstrow. However, Albert died without issue in 1483 and his lands were inherited by his younger brother Magnus II, Duke of Mecklenburg-Schwerin.

When Magnus died in 1503, his sons Henry V and Albert VII at first ruled jointly over the entire Mecklenburg duchy until its renewed division by the 1520 Neubrandenburg Treaty. Albert, a fierce opponent of the Protestant Reformation, had insisted on the partition and became duke of Mecklenburg-Güstrow, while his brother Henry retained Mecklenburg-Schwerin. However Mecklenburg de jure remained undivided; both brothers held the title of Duke of Mecklenburg and, as Henry only left one insane son when he died in 1552, the Schwerin lands fell back to Albert's sons Ulrich III and John Albert I.

At this time John Albert and Ulrich had ruled jointly over the Güstrow lands, but now came into conflict over the inherited Schwerin part. The controversy was finally decided in 1556 by the Ruppin dictum of Joachim II Hector, Elector of Brandenburg: John Albert I received Schwerin while Ulrich remained Duke of Mecklenburg-Güstrow. Ulrich died without heirs in 1603 and Güstrow fell back to John Albert's grandchildren Adolf Frederick I and John Albert II, joint rulers of Mecklenburg-Schwerin from 1610 onwards.

Mecklenburg-Güstrow was created for a third and final time with the partition of 1621, when John Albert II received the Güstrow part of Mecklenburg. In 1628 he and his brother at Schwerin were stripped of their duchies by order of Emperor Ferdinand II von Habsburg in favour of his Generalissimo Albrecht von Wallenstein. Officially the dukes were reproached for having secretly sided with Christian IV, King of Denmark, while in fact Mecklenburg was given in compensation of the enormous expenses Wallenstein had paid in building up Imperial troops. He took his residence at Güstrow but was dismissed by the Emperor three years later under pressure from the Prince-electors, while the dukes with the support of Swedish troops were restored.

The House of Mecklenburg-Güstrow had assumed the administration of the former Catholic Prince-Bishopric of Ratzeburg after its conversion to Lutheranism in 1554. By the 1648 Peace of Westphalia, the diocese was finally secularised and adjudicated to the last administrator, Duke Gustav Adolph.

Gustav Adolph's death in 1695 led to an inheritance dispute between his son-in-law Adolphus Frederick II, younger son of Adolf Frederick I and his nephew Frederick William, Duke of Mecklenburg-Schwerin, which would lead to the creation of Mecklenburg-Strelitz in 1701.

Dukes of Mecklenburg-Güstrow 
 Albert VI 1480–1483
Güstrow reunited with Mecklenburg[-Schwerin] 1483–1520
 Albert VII 1520–1547
 John Albert I 1547–1556, son
 Ulrich III 1556–1603, brother
 Charles I 1603–1610, brother, custodian for:
 John Albert II 1610–1628, jointly with his brother
 Adolf Frederick I, Duke of Mecklenburg-Schwerin 1610–1621
 Albrecht von Wallenstein (non-dynast) 1628–1631 
 John Albert II (restored) 1631–1636
 Gustav Adolph 1636–1695, son
To Mecklenburg-Schwerin

References 
 Regnal chronologies
 
 Map of Mecklenburg-Güstrow in 1600, Euratlas.net

States and territories established in 1480
1480 establishments in Europe
1695 disestablishments in the Holy Roman Empire
States and territories established in 1520
States and territories disestablished in 1695
Duchies of the Holy Roman Empire
House of Mecklenburg
Former principalities
History of Mecklenburg
Former states and territories of Mecklenburg-Western Pomerania
1520 establishments in the Holy Roman Empire